Zálužice is a municipality and village in Louny District in the Ústí nad Labem Region of the Czech Republic. It has about 100 inhabitants.

Administrative parts
Villages of Rybňany and Stekník are administrative parts of Zálužice.

References

Villages in Louny District